The École nationale supérieure d'architecture de Toulouse is a French school of architecture, a unit of the University of Toulouse.

Diploma 
The school delivers the following diplomas in architecture :
 Bachelor's degree
 Master's degree.

Research
Around 50 researchers work at the "Research Laboratory in architecture" since 1970. They participate in the establishment of the foundations of architectural, urban and landscape research.

References

External links
 Official website

Toulouse
Architecture
Educational institutions established in 1969